Sukiyaki and Other Japanese Hits is an album by Kyu Sakamoto released in 1963 in the U.S. by Capitol Records.  All of the songs on the album are sung in Japanese and feature the title track, a #1 hit in the U.S. for three weeks in 1963, and peaking at #6 in the UK when issued by EMI on its HMV label.  The 'b'-side, "Anoko No Namaewa Nantenkana", and a cover of "Good Timin'", a hit in 1960 for R&B singer Jimmy Jones, in both the US and the UK.

The Japanese text on the box translates as "gunpowder".

Track listing
Side one
 Ue o muite arukō (Sukiyaki)
 Tsun Tsun Bushi (The Tsun Tsun Song)
 Hitoribocchi No Futari (The Lonesome Two)
 Kyu-chan Ondo (The Kyu-Chan Folk March Song)
 Mo Hitori No Boku (It's Just Not the Real Me)
 Good Timin'

Side two
 Boku No Hoshi (My Star)
 Kiminanka Kiminanka (I Couldn't Care for You, Not You, Not You!)
 Kyu-chan No Zuntatatta (The Zuntatatta Song)
 Hige No Uta (My First Whisker)
 Goodbye, Joe
 Anoko No Namaewa Nantenkana (I Wonder What Her Name Is)

Personnel
1-1, 1-3, 2-2, 2-4, 2-6 (Rokusuke Ei/Hachidai Nakamura); 1-2 (Kyu Sakamoto/Trad, arr Hiroaki "Tessho" Hagiwara); 1-4, 2-3 (Yukio Aoshima/Danny Iida); 1-5 (Yukio Aoshima/Hachidai Nakamura); 1-6 (Fred Tobias/Clint Ballard, Jr./Kenji Sazanami); 2-1 (Yoji Yamada/Danny Iida); 2-5 (Hans-Artur Wittstatt/Günter Loose/Norman Newell/Kenji Sazanami)
recorded in Tokyo by Koji Kusano
produced in the U.S.A. by Dave Dexter, Jr.
catalog no. T 10349

References

1963 albums
Kyu Sakamoto albums
Japanese-language albums
Capitol Records albums